Monticello is a town in and the county seat of Lawrence County, Mississippi, United States. The population was 1,571 at the 2010 census.

Geography
Monticello is in central Lawrence County, on the west side of the Pearl River. U.S. Route 84 runs through the north side of the town on a four-lane bypass. US 84 leads east  to Prentiss and west  to Interstate 55 in Brookhaven. Mississippi Highway 27 passes through the west side of Monticello, leading north  to Crystal Springs and south  to Tylertown.

Demographics

2020 census

As of the 2020 United States census, there were 1,441 people, 640 households, and 350 families residing in the town.

2000 census
As of the census of 2000, there were 1,726 people, 690 households, and 451 families residing in the town. The population density was 530.4 people per square mile (205.1/km2). There were 754 housing units at an average density of 231.7 per square mile (89.6/km2). The racial makeup of the town was 64.19% White, 34.18% African American, 0.98% Asian, and 0.64% from two or more races. Hispanic or Latino of any race were 0.06% of the population.

There were 690 households, out of which 32.2% had children under the age of 18 living with them, 42.9% were married couples living together, 19.0% had a female householder with no husband present, and 34.6% were non-families. 32.9% of all households were made up of individuals, and 15.4% had someone living alone who was 65 years of age or older. The average household size was 2.37 and the average family size was 3.01.

In the town, the population was spread out, with 27.5% under the age of 18, 8.7% from 18 to 24, 24.8% from 25 to 44, 20.8% from 45 to 64, and 18.2% who were 65 years of age or older. The median age was 37 years. For every 100 females there were 77.9 males. For every 100 females age 18 and over, there were 71.4 males.

The median income for a household in the town was $27,109, and the median income for a family was $40,063. Males had a median income of $36,429 versus $16,538 for females. The per capita income for the town was $16,013. About 23.3% of families and 27.8% of the population were below the poverty line, including 39.2% of those under age 18 and 15.0% of those age 65 or over.

Education
The town of Monticello is served by the Lawrence County School District. The district is under the supervision of Superintendent Tammy Fairburn, who took office in 2012.

Notable people
 Richard Olney Arrington, justice of the Supreme Court of Mississippi from 1950-1963
 Erick Dampier, NBA center
 Katherine Ettl, sculptor
 Major Everett, former NFL running back
 Cindy Hyde-Smith, United States Senator
 Al Jefferson, forward/center for the NBA Indiana Pacers
 Kendra King, Miss Mississippi USA 2006
 J. B. Lenoir, blues singer
 Charles Lynch, 8th and 11th Governor of Mississippi
 Henry Mayson, former member of the Mississippi House of Representatives and attended the 1868 Mississippi Constitutional Convention
 Harvey McGehee, former member of the Mississippi State Senate and justice of the Supreme Court of Mississippi from 1937 to 1964
 Jim Pace, professional racing driver
 Rod Paige, former U.S. Secretary of Education
 Neville Patterson, justice of the Supreme Court of Mississippi from 1962 to 1986
 Rosalind Peychaud, former member of the Louisiana House of Representatives
 Hiram Runnels, 9th Governor of Mississippi
 George Washington Russell, member of the Mississippi House of Representatives 1916 to 1924
 Francis M. Sheppard, former member of the Mississippi State Senate and Mississippi House of Representatives
 Byther Smith, blues singer
 T. B. Stamps, former member of the Louisiana House of Representatives and the Louisiana State Senate
 William Sutton Sr., former President of Mississippi Valley State University
 Matthew Wells, American football linebacker

See also

Atwood Music Festival

References

External links

Official website

Towns in Lawrence County, Mississippi
County seats in Mississippi